Pauri Legislative Assembly constituency is one of the 70 constituencies in the Uttarakhand Legislative Assembly of Uttarakhand state of India. Pauri is also part of Garhwal Lok Sabha constituency.

Members of Legislative Assembly

Election results

2022

2017

See also
 Pauri
 Pauri Garhwal district
 List of constituencies of Uttarakhand Legislative Assembly

References

External links
  

Pauri Garhwal district
Assembly constituencies of Uttarakhand